Chalcosyrphus ventralis is a species of hoverfly in the family Syrphidae.

Distribution
Aru Islands.

References

Eristalinae
Insects described in 1858
Diptera of Australasia
Taxa named by Francis Walker (entomologist)